Premer is a small town in North-Western New South Wales, Australia.

Premer consists of residential houses, Premer Public School, a preschool, a caravan park, a community health centre, a Lions club, a post office, a town hall, a church, farms and a hotel.

Transport 
The town formerly had a station on the Binnaway-Werris Creek railway line.

Maps 
 Street-directory.com.au

Notes and references

External links

Towns in New South Wales
Liverpool Plains Shire